Dinoscaris is a genus of beetles in the family Carabidae, containing the following species:

 Dinoscaris atrox (Bänninger, 1934)
 Dinoscaris cribripennis (Chaudoir, 1843)
 Dinoscaris detriei (Alluaud, 1902)
 Dinoscaris gallienii (Alluaud, 1902)
 Dinoscaris rostrata (Fairmaire, 1905)
 Dinoscaris sicardi (Jeannel, 1946)
 Dinoscaris venator (Chaudoir, 1855)

References

Scaritinae